Jonathan Kendall Rigby (born 31 January 1965) is an English former professional footballer who played in the Football League for Norwich City, Aldershot and Cambridge United.

Rigby was born in Bury St Edmunds, and began his career with Norwich City, with whom he won a FA Youth Cup winner's medal in 1983. A forward, he made ten first-team appearances for Norwich, without scoring, and after that he played for Aldershot and Cambridge United. Summers 1983-1987 he played in Finland, Kokkola for Kokkolan Palloseura (KPS). In Finland he played in second-, third-, and fourth-highest division's. He retired from the professional game due to a pelvic injury, then played non-league football in Norfolk for Thetford Town and Wroxham.

Honours
 FA Youth Cup winner: 1983

References

External links
Career information at Flown From The Nest

1965 births
Living people
Sportspeople from Bury St Edmunds
English footballers
Association football forwards
Norwich City F.C. players
Aldershot F.C. players
Cambridge United F.C. players
English Football League players
Wroxham F.C. players